Hansjörg Schmidt (born ) is a German Social Democratic politician and Member of the Hamburg Parliament since 7 March 2011.

Life and work 
After his final exams and computer science studies Schmidt founded the software company WICE GmbH in 2001 together with four of his fellow students. Currently, Schmidt is the chief marketing officer of WICE GmbH.

Political career 
Schmidt has been a member of the SPD in Hamburg-Mitte since 1997, and was their deputy parliamentary group leader between 2001 and 2008. Since 2008 he is the parliamentary group leader and SPD's speaker in the urban planning commission of Hamburg. Schmidt ran for the 2008 Hamburg state election in voting district 1 (Hamburg-Mitte), resulting in 8.0 percent of the votes in his district. He was elected into Parliament at the election of 2008. A rerun for the 2011 Hamburg state election was successful and Schmidt gathered 10.2 percent of the votes in the same district. Since 7 March 2011 Hansjörg Schmidt has been a Member of the Hamburg Parliament.

References

External links 

 Hansjörg Schmidt on abgeordnetenwatch.de 
 Hansjörg Schmidt on hh-zeitung.de 

1974 births
Living people
Social Democratic Party of Germany politicians
People from Hamburg-Mitte
Businesspeople in information technology
Members of the Hamburg Parliament